Charles Abraham Essegian (born August 9, 1931) is an American former professional baseball left fielder. He appeared in 404 games in Major League Baseball (MLB) over six seasons (1958–1963) for the Philadelphia Phillies, St. Louis Cardinals, Los Angeles Dodgers, Baltimore Orioles, Kansas City Athletics and Cleveland Indians. During the 1959 World Series, Essegian, then with the Dodgers, set a Series record with two pinch-hit home runs against the Chicago White Sox. The mark would be matched by Bernie Carbo of the Boston Red Sox, who a hit pair of pinch-hit homers against the Cincinnati Reds in the 1975 Series.

Essegian also played one season (1964) in Nippon Professional Baseball (NPB) for the Kintetsu Buffaloes.

Stanford baseball and football star
Essegian was born in Boston but grew up from the age of five in Los Angeles. He graduated from Fairfax High School and matriculated at Stanford University in Palo Alto, California, where he played varsity baseball and football. A linebacker, he played in the Rose Bowl after Stanford's 1951 football season and is the second player (after Jackie Jensen) to have appeared in both the World Series and the Rose Bowl.

MLB career
He began the year with the Cardinals, playing in 17 games but batting only .179; he was sent down to Rochester, then traded to the Dodgers on June 15. His hometown team optioned Essegian to Triple-A Spokane for six weeks before recalling him in early August. Essegian responded by batting .304 for the Dodgers in 24 games and helped them win the National League (NL) pennant. Then, during the 1959 World Series, he clubbed his two pinch hit homers; the first, hit in the seventh inning of Game 2 off Bob Shaw, enabled the Dodgers to tie the game 2–2 and turn the tide of the World Series. After losing Game 1 to the White Sox 11–0, with Essegian's game-tying blast (then Charlie Neal's two-run shot two batters later), Los Angeles went on to win Game 2, 4–3, and then capture the world championship in six games.

Essegian continued his nomadic career soon after the 1959 Fall Classic, however. After batting only .215 in 52 games for the 1960 Dodgers, he was dealt to the American League (AL), where he had a one-game trial with the Orioles, two stints (1961) with the Athletics, and his most prolonged tenure, 166 games, as a member of the Indians (1961–). He was traded along with Jerry Walker from the Orioles to the Athletics for Dick Hall and Dick Williams on April 12, 1961. His most productive season came in 1962, when he posted career bests in batting (.274), runs (59), hits (92), doubles (12), home runs (21), runs batted in (RBI) (50), and games played (106). In his six-season career, Essegian was a .255 hitter (260-for-1,018) with 45 doubles, four triples, 47 home runs, and 150 RBI in 404 games. Defensively, he recorded a .981 fielding percentage as an outfielder.

Japan and minor leagues
Following his big league career, Essegian played the  season in NPB, for the Kintetsu Buffaloes of the Pacific League. He also played in seven seasons in Minor League Baseball (MiLB) seasons between 1953 and 1959, registering a .311 average, with 97 homers, in 717 games.

Life after baseball
After Essegian’s baseball career ended, he earned a law degree and became an attorney in Southern California, retiring in 1987.

References

External links

1931 births
Living people
American expatriate baseball players in Japan
American people of Armenian descent
Baltimore Orioles players
Baseball players from Boston
Channel Cities Oilers players
Cleveland Indians players
Kansas City Athletics players
Kintetsu Buffaloes players
Lawyers from Los Angeles
Little Rock Travelers players
Los Angeles Dodgers Legend Bureau
Los Angeles Dodgers players
Major League Baseball outfielders
Miami Marlins (IL) players
Montgomery Rebels players
Philadelphia Phillies players
Rochester Red Wings players
Sacramento Solons players
St. Louis Cardinals players
Salem Senators players
Schenectady Blue Jays players
Spokane Indians players
Baseball players from Los Angeles
Stanford Cardinal baseball players
Stanford Cardinal football players
Stanford University alumni
Tulsa Oilers (baseball) players
Visalia Cubs players
Fairfax High School (Los Angeles) alumni